Diego Corrientes is a 1959 Spanish historical adventure film directed by Antonio Isasi-Isasmendi and starring José Suarez, Marisa de Leza and Eulália del Pino. It portrays the life of the eighteenth century highwaymen Diego Corrientes Mateos.

Synopsis 
The greed and usury of the Count of Albanes has inflamed the town where Diego Corrientes lives. He confronts the tyrannical count and the latter takes revenge on him by whipping him in the woods. After being rescued by Beatriz, the count's fiancee, Diego is arrested again, managing to escape from the galley that takes him to Seville, but in the scuffle a soldier accidentally dies, which causes Diego to be accused of murder. At that time, Diego Corrientes formed a gang with a few evicted peasants and fled to the mountains, devoting himself to stealing from the rich to distribute among the poor.

Cast
 José Suárez as Diego Corrientes  
 Marisa de Leza as Beatriz  
 Eulália del Pino as Carmela 
 Milo Quesada as Conde  
 Jesús Colomer as Agustín  
 José Marco as Martín  
 Luis Induni as Mochuelo 
 Josep Maria Angelat 
 Rafael Bardem 
 Manuel Bronchud 
 Juan Cebrián 
 Camino Delgado 
 Miquel Graneri
 Margarita Lozano 
 Antonio Martín 
 Juan Monfort 
 Luis Orduña 
 José Manuel Pinillos
 Carlos Ronda 
 Benito Simón 
 Francisco Tuset

References

Bibliography
 de España, Rafael. Directory of Spanish and Portuguese film-makers and films. Greenwood Press, 1994.

External links 

1959 films
1950s Spanish-language films
Films directed by Antonio Isasi-Isasmendi
Films set in the 18th century
Films set in Spain
Films set in Portugal
1950s historical adventure films
1959 crime films
Spanish crime films
Spanish historical adventure films
1950s Spanish films